Nicolas Nahas (born 28 November 1946) is a Lebanese businessman and politician. He was the minister of economy and trade between 2011 and 2014.

Early life and education
Nahas was born in Tripoli on 28 November 1946. He received a bachelor of science degree in civil engineering from Saint Joseph University in 1972 Then he attended the postgraduate ISMP program at Harvard Business School in 1992. and received a degree in business administration there.

Career
Nahas began his career as a businessman in varied fields. In 2005, he was appointed by Prime Minister Najib Mikati as the chief economical counsellor. Nahas was appointed minister of economy and trade on 13 June 2011 to the cabinet led by Najib Mikati. He was one of the government ministers appointed by the prime minister in the cabinet.

Personal life
Nahas is married to Antoinette Haidar and has three children.

References

External links

20th-century Lebanese businesspeople
21st-century Lebanese businesspeople
1946 births
Harvard Business School alumni
Greek Orthodox Christians from Lebanon
Lebanese civil engineers
Living people
Members of the Parliament of Lebanon
People from Tripoli, Lebanon
Saint Joseph University alumni
Azm Movement politicians
Economy and Trade ministers of Lebanon